Lycée Français Victor Hugo de Port-Gentil is a French secondary international school in Port-Gentil, Gabon. It serves collège (junior high school) and lycée (senior high school) levels, and was established in 1990. In September 2014, it had 325 students.

The school is named after the 19th-century French writer Victor Hugo.

See also

 Education in Gabon
 List of international schools

References

External links
  , the school's official website

1990 establishments in Gabon
Educational institutions established in 1990
French international schools in Gabon
International high schools
Port-Gentil
Victor Hugo
High schools and secondary schools in Gabon